Charles Dudley "Chuck" Hinton (August 11, 1939January 30, 1999) was an American football defensive tackle in the National Football League. He played for the Pittsburgh Steelers (1964–1970), the New York Jets, and the Baltimore Colts (1972).  He went to North Carolina Central University. While with the Steelers, he anchored the defensive front with Gene "Big Daddy" Lipscomb. He was an outstanding run defender as was Lipscomb.

External links
Steelers programme notes about Chuck Hinton from November 5th, 1967

1939 births
1999 deaths
Players of American football from Raleigh, North Carolina
American football defensive tackles
North Carolina Central Eagles football players
Pittsburgh Steelers players
New York Jets players
Baltimore Colts players